The SASDK is Microsoft's Speech Application SDK. It is used to create telephony applications as well as multimodal web applications. It complies with the SALT XML standard, unlike Microsoft's earlier endeavors. The SASDK is used to create Web-based applications only. It can be used to create a single application with both a web interface and a telephony interface.

It also includes a speech add-in for Internet Explorer that supports Speech Application Language Tags (SALT) 1.0.

See also
 Speech Application Language Tags (SALT)
 Microsoft SAPI
 Microsoft Speech Server
 VoiceXML (a competing W3C standard)

References

External links
Creating .NET Applications That Talk
Download Microsoft Speech Application SDK 1.1

Microsoft development tools